Morris Basin is a basin, about  in area, in the northern part of the Ricker Hills, in the Prince Albert Mountains of Victoria Land, Antarctica. The southern part of the basin is ice free but the northern portion is occupied by a large lobe of ice. The basin was mapped by the United States Geological Survey from surveys and U.S. Navy air photos, 1956–62, and was named by the Advisory Committee on Antarctic Names for Robert W. Morris, a biologist at McMurdo Station in the 1965–66 and 1966–67 seasons.

References

Structural basins of Antarctica
Landforms of Oates Land